Mikrani  मिकरानी) are a Muslim community found in the Sarlahi [Parsa] and Rautahat districts of Nepal, Bihar, Bijnor Uttar Pradesh and Gujarat in India, Rajshahi, Gaibandha, Dinajpur, Old Dhaka in Bangladesh as well as in Pakistan and Afghanistan. They are also known as Mukeri, Makrani, Mekrani, Barmaki, Ranki and Muzkeri. They belong to the Muker tribe and the Mikrani title is mostly used in Nepal, India and Bangladesh while some also use Mukeri or Miya Mukeri.

References

Bibliography
 

Ethnic groups in Nepal
Ethnic groups in Pakistan
Ethnic groups in India